The men's double sculls competition at the 1952 Summer Olympics took place at Meilahti, Finland. The event was held from 20 July until 23 July.

Heats
First two rowers advanced directly to semi-finals. The others must compete in the repechage for remaining spots in the semi-finals.

Heat 1

Heat 2

Heat 3

Heat 4

First repechage
The winner in each heat qualified for the semi-finals.

Heat 1

Heat 2

Semi-finals
The winners in each heat qualified for the final, while the others must compete in the second repechage for the remaining spots in the final.

Semi-final 1

Semi-final 2

Second repechage
The winners in each heat qualified for the final.

Heat 1

Heat 2

Heat 3

Final

References

External links

Rowing at the 1952 Summer Olympics